The ABA NLB League 2007–08, the seventh season of the regional Liga ABA, saw a further change in the competition structure. After trying a playoff system the previous year, the league returned to a combination of elimination and a Final Four tournament.

14 teams from Slovenia, Montenegro, Bosnia and Herzegovina, Croatia and Serbia participated in the NLB League in its seventh season: Union Olimpija, Helios, Geoplin Slovan, Cibona, Zadar, Zagreb, Split, Široki ERONET, Crvena zvezda, Partizan, Hemofarm, FMP Železnik, Vojvodina and Budućnost.

There were 26 rounds played in the regular part of the season. Eight best teams from the regular season qualified for the best-of-three quarter-final series. The Final Four Tournament was later held in Ljubljana.

Partizan became the 2008 League Champion.

Team information

Venues and locations

Regular season

Stats Leaders

Points

Rebounds

Assists

Ranking MVP

Playoffs

* if necessary

Final four
Matches played at Hala Tivoli, Ljubljana

Semifinals

Partizan vs. Union Olimpija

Zadar vs. Hemofarm STADA

Final

ABA clubs in European competitions

External links

2007–08
2007–08 in European basketball leagues
2007–08 in Serbian basketball
2007–08 in Slovenian basketball
2007–08 in Croatian basketball
2007–08 in Bosnia and Herzegovina basketball